Haute-Garonne is a department in the Occitanie region of Southwestern France. Named after the river Garonne, which flows through the department. Its prefecture and main city is Toulouse, the country's fourth-largest. In 2019, it had a population of 1,400,039.

History

Haute-Garonne is one of the original 83 departments created during the French Revolution on 4 March 1790. It was created from part of the former provinces of Languedoc and Guyenne/Gascony.

The department was originally larger. The reduction in its area resulted from an imperial decree dated 21 November 1808 and which established the neighbouring department of Tarn-et-Garonne, to the north. The new department, created in response to the pleadings of various locally powerful politicians, took territory from five surrounding departments including Haute-Garonne. The districts lost to Tarn-et-Garonne in 1808 were those of Montech and Castelsarrasin.

Geography

Haute-Garonne is part of the current region of Occitanie and is surrounded by the departments of Hautes-Pyrénées, Gers, Tarn-et-Garonne, Tarn, Aude, and Ariège. It also borders Spain in the south (province of Lleida and province of Huesca). According to the Köppen climate classification, the Haute-Garonne department has Oceanic climate, Subarctic climate and Polar climate.

The borders of the department follow the river. The Garonne enters France from Spain at the town of Fos, and goes through Toulouse and leaves the department. The extreme south of the department lies in the Pyrenees mountain range and is very mountainous.

Demographics
The inhabitants of the department are called Haut-Garonnais. The greatest population concentration is around Toulouse. The south of the department is quite sparsely populated. Overall the department had a population of 1.4 million as of the 2019 census. Young people are well represented with 55% of the population under the age of 40 and of those, 16% are between the ages of 20 and 29. This is in part because Toulouse is an important university town. The department has also received significant migration from other parts of the country.

Principal towns

The most populous commune is Toulouse, the prefecture. As of 2019, there are 8 communes with more than 15,000 inhabitants:

Politics

This department was the political base of former Prime Minister Lionel Jospin.

Departmental Council of Haute-Garonne
The Departmental Council of Haute-Garonne comprises 54 seats. In the 2015 departmental elections, the Socialist Party (PS) won 48 seats. The Republicans secured the remaining 6 seats. The President of the Departmental Council has been Georges Méric (PS) since 2015.

Members of the National Assembly
Haute-Garonne elected the following members of the National Assembly during the 2017 legislative election:

Tourism

Main sights
Haute-Garonne's main sights include:

Winter sports
The department has four ski resorts:
 Peyragudes (1600 m -2450 m), 55 km of slopes
 Luchon-Superbagnères (1440 m - 2260 m), 30 km of slopes
 Le Mourtis (1380 m - 1816 m), 22 km of slopes
 Bourg-d'Oueil (1350 m - 1500 m)

See also
 Cantons of the Haute-Garonne department
 Communes of the Haute-Garonne department
 Arrondissements of the Haute-Garonne department

References

External links
  Departmental Council website
  Prefecture website 
  Tourism website
  Photography Panoramics 360° website

 
1790 establishments in France
Departments of Occitania (administrative region)
Occitanie region articles needing translation from French Wikipedia
Massif Central
States and territories established in 1790